The Stone Manor is a historic Italianate residence in Homer Glen, Illinois.

History
Elijah D. Gorham moved to Homer Township in 1863. The lumber for the house was cut from the farmstead; other timber was traded for limestone from the Joliet Prison. Gorham later moved to rural Kansas and founded the town of Gorham. Ownership of the farm remained in Gorham's hands until his death in 1906. Gorham's widow sold the property to James D. Frazer. The Frazer family owned the residence until 1977. The house was recognized by the National Park Service with a listing on the National Register of Historic Places on November 26, 1980.

Architecture
The Stone Manor is an excellent local example of Italianate architecture. Representative of the style, the house is symmetrical and features arched windows and ornate trim. The hipped roof was originally covered in wood shingles, but these have seen been replaced with asphalt ones. The house was trimmed with wood harvested on the original farmstead. The building is capped with a  cupola. The house sits on a full basement with a limestone slab floor. The first floor has six rooms and the second floor has five; the cupola and the attic provide additional interior space. A gable-roofed barn is found  behind the house.

References

Houses on the National Register of Historic Places in Illinois
National Register of Historic Places in Will County, Illinois
Houses completed in 1865
Houses in Will County, Illinois